John Hamilton Fletcher, Sr. (March 31, 1901 - June 4, 1977) was a college football player.

College Football
Fletcher was a prominent fullback for the Georgia Bulldogs of the University of Georgia, selected All-Southern in 1922.  Walter Camp gave him honorable mention on his All-America team. In the game against Tennessee in 1923, one account reads "he rammed the ball almost the entire length of the field on two occasions." He was elected captain of the 1924 team, but went down with injury and had his place at captain filled by tackle Jim Taylor. At Georgia he was a member of Alpha Tau Omega.

References

American football fullbacks
Georgia Bulldogs football players
All-Southern college football players
People from Tifton, Georgia

1901 births
1977 deaths